Johannes (Juho) Lehmus (19 December 1858, Orivesi - 6 April 1918, Tampere; original surname Lindgren) was a Finnish shoemaker, smallholder and politician. He was a member of the Parliament of Finland from 1916 until his death in 1918, representing the Social Democratic Party of Finland (SDP). During the Finnish Civil War, he sided with the Reds, was made prisoner by White troops and shot in Tampere on 6 April 1918.

References

1858 births
1918 deaths
People from Orivesi
People from Häme Province (Grand Duchy of Finland)
Social Democratic Party of Finland politicians
Members of the Parliament of Finland (1916–17)
Members of the Parliament of Finland (1917–19)
People of the Finnish Civil War (Red side)
People executed by Finland by firing squad